Layth Ali Abdulrahim Kharoub (born 11 July 1991) is a Palestinian footballer who plays as a winger for West Bank Premier League club Markaz Balata and the Palestine national team.

Club career 
On 15 January 2017, Kharoub joined Ahli Al-Khaleel. After joining Shabab Al-Dhahiriya in summer 2017, Kharoub returned to Thaqafi Tulkarem on 27 December of the same year.

International career 
Kharoub represented Palestine at the 2020 Bangabandhu Cup; he scored on his debut on 15 January, helping Palestine beat hosts Bangladesh 2–0 in the group stage. Kharoub scored three goals in the tournament, including one in the final on 25 January against Burundi, won 3–1, to help Palestine win the competition.

Career statistics

International 

Scores and results list Palestine's goal tally first, score column indicates score after each Kharoub goal.

Honours
Palestine
 Bangabandhu Cup: 2020

References

External links
 
 

1991 births
Living people
People from Nablus
Palestinian footballers
Association football wingers
Thaqafi Tulkarem players
Shabab Al-Bireh Institute players
Shabab Al-Dhahiriya SC players
Shabab Al-Khalil SC players
Ahli Al-Khaleel players
Markaz Balata players
West Bank Premier League players
Palestine international footballers